WIEM Encyklopedia (full name in  - "Great Interactive Multimedia Encyclopedia"; in Polish, wiem also means 'I know') is a Polish Internet encyclopedia.

The first printed edition was released in mid-1990s, with the second in 1998, it contained about 66,000 entries and various multimedia add-ons. It was released online in 2000 by the Polish web portal Onet.pl on the basis of Popularna Encyklopedia Powszechna i Multimedialna ("Popular General and Multimedia Encyclopedia"). From 2004 to 2 March 2006 it was not free, however before and after it was free to access. As of the 9th online edition in 2006, it contains 125,000 entries.

External links
 Homepage

Polish online encyclopedias
Polish encyclopedias
20th-century encyclopedias